"Top Floor" is a song by American rapper Gunna featuring fellow American rapper Travis Scott, from the former's second studio album Wunna (2020). It was written alongside producers Turbo and Wheezy.

Composition
The song contains horns in the production in a similar style to marching band fanfares, as well as Auto-Tuned chants from Travis Scott.

Critical reception
Mimi Kenny of HipHopDX called it "perfect for those who want a sequel to So Much Fun standout 'Hot.'" Alphonse Pierre of Pitchfork criticized Travis Scott's feature, describing that it seems like "nothing more than formalities to juice streaming numbers". In contrast, Hamza Riaz of Mic Cheque deemed the song a standout from Wunna and wrote, "It's finally a Travis Scott feature that doesn't sound phoned-in."

Charts

References

2020 songs
Gunna (rapper) songs
Travis Scott songs
Songs written by Gunna (rapper)
Songs written by Travis Scott
Songs written by Turbo (record producer)
Songs written by Wheezy (record producer)
Song recordings produced by Turbo (record producer)
Song recordings produced by Wheezy (record producer)